Gan Yao-ming (born 2 February 1972) is a Taiwanese author from Miaoli County. He graduated from the Chinese department of Tunghai University. He received Master of Fine Arts in Creative Writing and English Literature from National Dong Hwa University. Before becoming a full-time fiction writer, Gan worked as a reporter, as a middle school teacher, and as a playwright of a small theater. In 2010, his novel  won the Award of Taipei International Book Fair, and in 2015, his The Pangcah Girl won the First Prize of Taiwan Literary Award.

Several of his novels have been adapted into television series. He has also served as writer-in-residence at Providence University.

Writing career 
Owing to his Hakka origin, Gan's writings are often colored with Hakka language, culture and history. In addition, Gan often uses dense imagery while appropriating elements from fairy tale, fable, and folklore. As a result, the feelings of humans and animals become interchangeable but at the same time remain distinct; the complex interactions among Taiwan's various ethnic and social groups are revealed as well. Gan is best known for the following two books:

The School of Water-ghosts and the Otter Who Lost His Mother melds various fairy-tale elements together; it received the China Times Annual Top 10 Book Award, with critics calling it that year's "most creative novel".

Killing the Ghost, a historical novel, deals with issues of Taiwanese identities resulting from fifty years of the Japanese occupation and from the iron-fist rule of the KMT after World War II. Gan Yao-ming, against the backdrops of the Kominka Movement (the Japanization of Taiwanese Movement in 1937 during the second Sino-Japan War)and the 228 Incident (the cause of the KMT's enforcement of martial law on Taiwan from 1947 to 1987), depicts the insanity of that era as well as the unfailing vitality of people living on the island of Taiwan, be they post-World War II Mainland Chinese emigres, or the natives formerly colonized by the Japanese.

Publications 
Novels:
Mysterious Train (Aquarius Publishing, 2003)
The School of Water-ghosts and the Otter Who Lost His Mother (Aquarius Publishing, 2005)
Killing the Ghost  (Aquarius Publishing, 2009)
Story of a Funeral (Aquarius Publishing, 2010)

Essays
Together with Li Chong-jian, A School with No Walls: An Independent Learning Paradise (Aquarius Publishing, 2004)

References

External links 
Taiwan Writers / Works Catalogue 2007 – Gan Yao-ming 
2009 China Times Book Review Award: Gao Yao-ming Killing Ghost
Gan Yao-ming – Joyous Journal

1972 births
Living people
People from Miaoli County
Taiwanese people of Hakka descent
National Dong Hwa University alumni
Tunghai University alumni
Taiwanese male novelists